cAMP-dependent protein kinase catalytic subunit gamma is an enzyme that in humans is encoded by the PRKACG gene.

Cyclic AMP-dependent protein kinase (PKA) consists of two catalytic subunits and a regulatory subunit dimer. This gene encodes the gamma form of its catalytic subunit. The gene is intronless and is thought to be a retrotransposon derived from the gene for the alpha form of the PKA catalytic subunit.

Interactions
PRKACG has been shown to interact with Ryanodine receptor 2.

References

Further reading

EC 2.7.11